Prakash Pant was a Bharatiya Janata Party leader and member of the Uttarakhand Legislative Assembly in India. He was elected from Pithoragarh (Vidhan Sabha constituency) in the 2002 to 2007 but in 2012 Uttarakhand Legislative Assembly election, he lost to Mayukh Mahar of Indian National Congress. He was the first speaker of Uttarakhand Legislative Assembly. He was also a minister in Government of Uttarakhand with portfolios of Tourism, Culture, Pilgrimage Endowment, parliamentary Affairs & Reorganization.

He died of cancer in Texas on 5 June 2019.

Family
Prakash Pant son of Mohan Chandra Pant, was born in a brahmin family at Pithoragarh, Uttarakhand. His wife is a school assistant teacher by profession.

Education
Prakash Pant completed his intermediate in the year 1977. In 1980, he graduated in Pharmacy from Dwarahat, a rural area in the district Almora.

Background
He joined a government hospital as a pharmacist. He resigned from government service and joined Bhartiya Janata Party. Apart from his political career, he was a shooter. In 2004, he won a gold medal in the state shooting championship. In the same year, he also won a silver medal in national level shooting competition (G.B. Mavlankar Shooting Competition, Coimbatore) in 2004.

Political career
Pant's political career started in the year 1977 when he was chosen as General Secretary of Military Science Board. In 1978, he was elected as the member of Municipal Council of Pithoragarh. Ten years later ,he was selected as the member of Legislative Council U.P. Soon when Uttaranchal (now Uttarakhand) became a state in 2000, Pant became the first speaker of the state assembly. In the first Assembly elections in 2002, he was elected to Uttarakhand Assembly from Pithoragarh and then again in 2007. With the Khanduri government coming to power, he became a cabinet minister and was given the parliamentary affairs portfolio. In 2012 election, he faced his first defeat from Mayukh Mahar of the Congress, but won in 2017 from Pithoragarh. Up until his death, Pant was a Cabinet Minister in the state of Uttarakhand and held portfolios of Tourism, Culture, Pilgrimage Endowment, Parliamentary Affairs, and Reorganization.

References

External links
 https://prakashpantbjp.com 
http://myneta.info/utk07/candidate.php?candidate_id=95
 http://legislativebodiesinindia.gov.in/States/uttranchal/mpa.htm 

http://www.newindianexpress.com/nation/2017/mar/24/uttarakhand-portfolios-distributed-cm-rawat-keeps-home-heath-pwd-1585336.html
 https://thewire.in/116486/prakash-pant-uttarakhand-chief-minister/

1960 births
2019 deaths
Members of the Uttarakhand Legislative Assembly
Bharatiya Janata Party politicians from Uttarakhand
Uttarakhand MLAs 2017–2022
Speakers of the Uttarakhand Legislative Assembly
State cabinet ministers of Uttarakhand
People from Pithoragarh
Finance Ministers of Uttarakhand